Jefferson Fernando Isídio (born 4 April 1997), better known as Jefferson Galego, is a Brazilian professional footballer who plays as a winger for the South Korean club Gangwon.

Professional career
Galego spent his early career with small club teams in Brazil, before signing a professional contract with Moreirense on 1 October 2020. Galego made his professional debut with Moreirense in a 0-0 Primeira Liga tie with Belenenses SAD on 18 October 2020.

References

External links
 
 Fora de Jogo Profile
 BD Futbol Profile

1997 births
Sportspeople from Pará
21st-century Brazilian people
Living people
Brazilian footballers
Association football wingers
Mogi Mirim Esporte Clube players
Clube Atlético Linense players
Marília Atlético Clube players
Guarani de Palhoça players
Red Bull Bragantino players
Associação Atlética Ponte Preta players
Associação Atlética Portuguesa (Santos) players
Moreirense F.C. players
Gangwon FC players
Campeonato Brasileiro Série C players
Primeira Liga players
K League 1 players
Brazilian expatriate footballers
Brazilian expatriate sportspeople in Portugal
Expatriate footballers in Portugal
Brazilian expatriate sportspeople in South Korea
Expatriate footballers in South Korea